Landry Q. Walker (born September 1, 1971), is an American comic book writer living in El Sobrante, California.

Biography
Landry Walker is the co-creator (with artist Eric Jones) of a number of comic book series, and was a regular contributor to Disney Adventures Magazine during the last several years of its run. He is known for his all-ages comics work, such as Supergirl: Cosmic Adventures in the 8th Grade, Batman: The Brave and the Bold and The Incredibles comic series. Walker is also a contributing writer for the gaming website Elder-Geek.

In 2012 Del Rey released an original Odd Thomas graphic novel written by Walker with series creator Dean Koontz. The book reached number 7 on the New York Times Best Sellers list for Graphic Novels. More recently, Walker began a new comic series (again with longtime collaborator Eric Jones) for Image Comics called Danger Club about a brutal world of teenage superheroes.

He is the co-creator of the internationally broadcast cartoon series called Scary Larry, which is an adaptation of his comic series titled Little Gloomy.

Bibliography

Comics
Comics work includes:
Filthy Habits #1-5 (1994–1996, Aeon Comics)
X-Ray Comics #1-3 (1997–1998, Slave Labor Graphics):
X-Ray Comics Volume 1: Filth (SLG Publishing, 2004)
X-Ray Comics Volume 2: Swine (SLG Publishing, 2004)
Comic Zone 4: Kid Gravity (Disney Press, 2005)
Little Gloomy #1-6 (1999–2001, Slave Labor Graphics, tpb, Little Gloomy: It was a Dark and Stormy Night, SLG Publishing, 2002)
The Super Scary Monster Show featuring Little Gloomy #1-3 (2005–2006, Slave Labor Graphics, tpb, 2008)
Tron: The Ghost in the Machine #1-6 (2006–2008, Slave Labor Graphics, tpb, 2009)
Supergirl: Cosmic Adventures in the Eighth Grade #1-6 (2008-2009 DC Comics, tpb, 2009)
The Incredibles: City of Incredibles (with co-author Mark Waid, Boom! Studios, tpb, 2010 )
The Incredibles: The Incredibles: Revenge From Below (with co-author Mark Waid, Boom! Studios, tpb, 2010 )
The Incredibles: The Incredibles: Secrets and Lies  Boom! Studios, tpb, 2010 )
The Incredibles: The Incredibles: Truth and Consequences   Boom! Studios, tpb, 2010 )
Batman: Joker's Asylum Vol. 2  (DC Comics, tpb, 2011) 1848569955
Batman: The Brave and the Bold: The Fearsome Fangs Strike Again *DC Comics, tpb, 2011)Batman: The Brave and the Bold: Emerald Knight *DC Comics, tpb, 2012,) 
Odd Thomas: House of Odd (Del Rey Books, tpb, 2012,) 
Danger Club Volume 1: Death (Image Comics, tpb, 2012 
Danger Club Volume 2: Rebirth (Image Comics, tpb, 2015 
A Clash of Kings Volume 1 (Batam, 2018 
The Last Siege (Image Comics, tpb, 2019 
A Clash of Kings Volume 2 (Batam, 2019 
The Infinite Adventures of Supernova: Pepper Page Saves the Universe! (First Second, 2021)

Short Stories

Star Wars: Nigh Noon on Jakku
Star Wars: The Face of Evil
Star Wars: True Love
Star Wars: All Creatures Great and Small
Star Wars: A Recipe for Death
Star Wars: The Crimson Corsair and the Lost Treasure of Count Dooku

Novels
Project Terra book 1: Crash Course  2017 
Project Terra book 2: Bites Back 2018

References

External links
 Official Twitter for Landry Walker

Elder-Geek.com

Living people
1971 births
American comics writers
People from El Sobrante, Contra Costa County, California